Paranomalocaris is a genus of primitive radiodont recovered from Wulongqing Formation, eastern Yunnan. It contains two species, Paranomalocaris multisegmentalis and P. simplex. It is only known from its frontal appendage (now known to be homologous to the labrum of euarthropod and primary antennae of Onychophorans). The frontal appendage features endites with numerous auxiliary spines, and at least 22 segments (podomeres), hence the specific name multisegmentalis.

References

Anomalocaridids
Fossil taxa described in 2013
Cambrian arthropods